Pachyseius is a genus of mites in the family Pachylaelapidae. There are about 17 described species in Pachyseius.

Species
These 17 species belong to the genus Pachyseius:

 Pachyseius angustiventris Willmann, 1935
 Pachyseius angustus Hyatt, 1956
 Pachyseius cavernicolus Ishikawa, 1989
 Pachyseius chenpengi Ma & Yin, 2000
 Pachyseius cicaki Mašán & Mihál, 2007
 Pachyseius friedrichi Mašán, 2008
 Pachyseius huanrenensis Chen, Bei & Gao, 2009
 Pachyseius humeralis Berlese, 1910
 Pachyseius iraola Moraza, 1993
 Pachyseius morazae Mašán & Mihál, 2007
 Pachyseius morenoi Moraza, 1993
 Pachyseius orientalis Nikolsky, 1982
 Pachyseius pachylaelapoides Mašán & Mihál, 2007
 Pachyseius sinicus Yin, Lu & Lan, 1986
 Pachyseius slavicus Mašán, 2007
 Pachyseius strandtmanni Solomon, 1982
 Pachyseius wideventris Afifi & Nasr, 1984

References

Pachylaelapidae
Articles created by Qbugbot